is a Japanese professional baseball infielder, playing for the Hanshin Tigers in Japan's Nippon Professional Baseball.

Early baseball career
Ueda started playing baseball in 2nd grade for the Kohnan Boys Baseball Club, where he alternated between pitcher and shortstop positions. It was only when he entered junior high that he decided to become a full-time shortstop.

He initially enrolled in the Japan Aviation High School in Yamanashi Prefecture, but decided to return to his hometown after a year. He transferred to Oumi High School where he secured the baseball team's shortstop position. In 2014, he helped his team make it all the way to the 96th Summer Koshien Tournament. Even though his team lost in the 3rd round, he recorded an impressive batting average of 0.571.

Hanshin Tigers

Before he graduated high school, he became the Hanshin Tigers' 5th round pick during the 2014 Nippon Professional Baseball draft. He inked the deal with the Tigers for a 5 million annual salary, and a 30 million signing bonus. He was assigned the jersey number 62.

References

External links
NPB stats

1996 births
Living people
Hanshin Tigers players
Japanese baseball players
Baseball people from Shiga Prefecture
Nippon Professional Baseball infielders